Tap is a village in the municipality of Tap Qaraqoyunlu in the Goranboy Rayon of Azerbaijan.

References

Populated places in Goranboy District